Merlin Paul Volzke (October 5, 1925 – February 21, 2013) was an American jockey who raced primarily on the West Coast of the United States. He began his professional career in the 1940s and in 1948 won the riding title at Longacres Racetrack in Renton, Washington.

In 1958, Volzke was honored with  the George Woolf Memorial Jockey Award, given to a jockey who demonstrates high standards of personal and professional conduct, on and off the racetrack.

Volzke retired from riding in the 1970s but remained in the industry, working as a Senior race steward at Los Alamitos Race Course in Cypress, California until he stepped down after twenty-six years of service at the age of 79 in 2005.

At ceremonies held at Hollywood Park Racetrack on July 11, 2009, Volzke was given the Laffit Pincay Jr. Award, an honor awarded annually since 2004 to an individual who has served the sport with integrity, extraordinary dedication, determination and distinction.

References

 ROAP directory for Merlin Volzke

1925 births
2013 deaths
American jockeys
Sportspeople from Nebraska
People from York County, Nebraska